Luis Gorocito (born October 15, 1992) is an Uruguayan professional footballer who plays for Necaxa  of Ascenso MX.

External links

Liga MX players
Living people
1992 births
Uruguayan footballers
Club Necaxa footballers
Uruguayan expatriates in Mexico
Association football forwards
Place of birth missing (living people)
21st-century Uruguayan people